The 2014 Fordham Rams football team represented Fordham University in the 2014 NCAA Division I FCS football season. They were led by third-year head coach Joe Moorhead and played their home games at Coffey Field. They were a member of the Patriot League. They finished the season 11–3, 6–0 in Patriot League play to win the Patriot League championship. They received the Patriot's automatic bid to the FCS Playoffs where they defeated the Sacred Heart in the first round before losing in the second round to New Hampshire.

Schedule

Ranking movements

References

Fordham
Fordham Rams football seasons
Patriot League football champion seasons
Fordham
Fordham Rams football